The fern bank salamander (Eurycea pterophila), also known as the Blanco River Springs salamander, is a species of salamander in the family Plethodontidae.
It is endemic to springs in the Blanco River watershed in central Texas, United States.

Its natural habitat is freshwater springs.

References

  (2000): Phylogenetic relationships of central Texas hemidactyliine plethodontid salamanders, genus Eurycea, and a taxonomic revision of the group. Herpetological Monographs 14: 1-80.
  (2001): A new species of subterranean blind salamander (Plethodontidae: Hemidactyliini: Eurycea: Typhlomolge) from Austin, Texas, and a systematic revision of central Texas paedomorphic salamanders. Herpetologica 57: 266–280.

Amphibians of the United States
Eurycea
Taxonomy articles created by Polbot
Amphibians described in 1950